The year 1755 in architecture involved some significant events.

Events
 November 1 – 1755 Lisbon earthquake in Portugal. Among many buildings destroyed is the Ópera do Tejo, designed by Giovanni Carlo Galli-Bibiena, opened only on March 31. The workforce completing the Mafra National Palace at Mafra is diverted to reconstruction work in Lisbon.

Buildings and structures

Buildings

 Groote Kerk, Galle, Zeilan, is inaugurated
 Reformed Church of Shawangunk, New York, is inaugurated
 Puning Temple of Chengde, Hebei Province, China is begun
 St John the Evangelist's Church, Lancaster, England, probably designed by Henry Sephton, is completed
 Teatro San Benedetto in Venice is inaugurated
 Church of the Savior on Bolvany in Moscow is consecrated
 Nuruosmaniye Mosque in Istanbul, designed by Mustafa Ağa and Simeon Kalfa, is completed
 Yalı Mosque in İzmir is built
 Towers and domes of Pažaislis Monastery in Kaunas, Polish–Lithuanian Commonwealth, are added
 Hôtel Gayot in Strasbourg is completed
 Hatch Court, Somerset, England, designed by the amateur Thomas Prowse, is built at about this date

Births
 January 29 (bapt.) – William Porden, English architect (died 1822)
 August 5 – James Playfair, Scottish Neoclassical architect (died 1794)
 September 3 – Johan Martin Quist, Danish architect (died 1818)
 Andreas Hallander, Danish architect (died 1828)
 Étienne Sulpice Hallet, French-born American architect (died 1825)

Deaths
 Johan Cornelius Krieger, Danish architect (born 1683)